The United Kingdom participated in the Eurovision Song Contest 2021 with the song "Embers" written by James Newman, Conor Blake, Danny Shah, Tom Hollings and Samuel Brennan. The song was performed by James Newman, who was internally selected by the British broadcaster BBC to represent the United Kingdom at the 2021 contest in Rotterdam, Netherlands after he was due to compete in the 2020 contest with "My Last Breath" before the event's cancellation. Newman was announced as the British entrant on 19 February 2021, while the song "Embers" was presented to the public on 11 March 2021.

As a member of the "Big Five", the United Kingdom automatically qualified to compete in the final of the Eurovision Song Contest. Performing in position 9, the United Kingdom placed 26th (last) out of the 26 participating countries, failing to score any points. This was the fifth time the nation had placed last in the history of the competition, and the second time the nation received nul points. The United Kingdom was also the first country to have received nul points since the implementation of the new system in 2016.

Background

Prior to the 2021 contest, the United Kingdom has participated in the Eurovision Song Contest sixty-two times. Thus far, the United Kingdom has won the contest five times: in 1967 with the song "Puppet on a String" performed by Sandie Shaw, in 1969 with the song "Boom Bang-a-Bang" performed by Lulu, in 1976 with the song "Save Your Kisses for Me" performed by Brotherhood of Man, in 1981 with the song "Making Your Mind Up" performed by Bucks Fizz and in 1997 with the song "Love Shine a Light" performed by Katrina and the Waves. To this point, the nation is noted for having finished as the runner-up in a record fifteen contests. Up to and including 1998, the UK had only twice finished outside the top 10, in 1978 and 1987. Since 1999, the year in which the rule was abandoned that songs must be performed in one of the official languages of the country participating, the UK has had less success, thus far only finishing within the top ten twice: in 2002 with the song "Come Back" performed by Jessica Garlick and in 2009 with the song "It's My Time" performed by Jade Ewen. For the 2019 contest, the United Kingdom finished in twenty-sixth (last) place out of twenty-six competing entries with the song "Bigger than Us" performed by Michael Rice.

The British national broadcaster, BBC, broadcasts the event within the United Kingdom and organises the selection process for the nation's entry. BBC announced that the United Kingdom would participate in the Eurovision Song Contest 2021 on 26 October 2020. Since 2016, BBC organised a national final featuring a competition among several artists and songs, while the broadcaster opted to internally select the British entry in 2020. The internal selection procedure was continued for their 2021 entry.

Before Eurovision

Internal selection 
On 19 February 2021, BBC confirmed that James Newman would represent the United Kingdom at the Eurovision Song Contest 2021. Collaboration between BBC Studios and record label BMG was also renewed. In regards to his re-selection as the British entrant, Newman stated: "I'm so excited and honoured to be getting a second chance at representing my country in the Eurovision Song Contest. I haven't stopped making new music in lockdown and I can't wait for everyone to hear the song I’m taking to Eurovision in 2021."

On 11 March 2021, the song "Embers" written by James Newman together with Conor Blake, Danny Shah, Tom Hollings and Samuel Brennan was presented to the public through the release of the official music video, which was directed by Charlie Lightening and filmed at RAF Greenham Common in Newbury, Berkshire, via the official Eurovision Song Contest's YouTube channel. In regards to the song, Newman stated: "I feel like everyone wants a party and to have some fun so when I was writing, that's what I had in my head. I wanted something people can dance to, even if it's just in their kitchen".

Promotion 
James Newman specifically promoted "Embers" as the British Eurovision entry by performing during several online international events, including the Concert in the Dark on 21 April which was organised by Eurovoix, the PrePartyES on 24 April which was organised by eurovision-spain.com, and the Adriatic PreParty on 1 May which was organised by Hrvatski Eurovizijski Klub.

At Eurovision 

According to Eurovision rules, all nations with the exceptions of the host country and the "Big Five" (France, Germany, Italy, Spain and the United Kingdom) are required to compete in one of two semi-finals, and qualify in order to participate in the final; the top ten countries from each semi-final progress to the final. As a member of the "Big Five", the United Kingdom automatically qualified to compete in the final on 22 May 2021. In addition to their participation in the final, the United Kingdom is also required to broadcast and vote in one of the two semi-finals. For the 2021 contest, the semi-final allocation draw held for 2020 which was held on 28 January 2020, was used. The United Kingdom was assigned to broadcast and vote in the second semi-final on 20 May 2021.

In the United Kingdom, the semi-finals were broadcast on BBC Four with commentary by Scott Mills, Sara Cox and Chelcee Grimes, while the final was televised on BBC One with commentary by Graham Norton and broadcast on BBC Radio 2 with commentary by Ken Bruce. Rylan Clark-Neal was initially announced as one of the commentators for the semi-finals, however he was replaced by Cox due to illness. The British spokesperson, who announced the top 12-point score awarded by the British jury during the final, was Amanda Holden.

Final 
After technical rehearsals were held on 15 May, the "Big Five" countries and host country Netherlands held a press conference. As part of this press conference, the artists took part in a draw to determine which half of the grand final they would subsequently participate in. The United Kingdom was drawn to compete in the first half. Following the conclusion of the second semi-final, the shows' producers decided upon the running order of the final. The running order for the semi-finals and final was decided by the shows' producers rather than through another draw, so that similar songs were not placed next to each other. The United Kingdom was subsequently placed to perform in position 9, following the entry from Serbia and before the entry from Greece. The United Kingdom placed twenty-sixth (last) in the final, failing to score any points from both the televoting and the juries. This was the fifth time the United Kingdom finished in last place and the second time the nation received nul points, the previous occasion being in 2003. The United Kingdom was also the first country to have received nul points since the implementation of the new system in 2016.

Voting 
Voting during the three shows involved each country awarding two sets of points from 1-8, 10 and 12: one from their professional jury and the other from televoting. Each nation's jury consisted of five music industry professionals who are citizens of the country they represent, with a diversity in gender and age represented. The judges assess each entry based on the performances during the second Dress Rehearsal of each show, which takes place the night before each live show, against a set of criteria including: vocal capacity; the stage performance; the song's composition and originality; and the overall impression by the act. Jury members may only take part in panel once every three years, and are obliged to confirm that they are not connected to any of the participating acts in a way that would impact their ability to vote impartially. Jury members should also vote independently, with no discussion of their vote permitted with other jury members. The exact composition of the professional jury, and the results of each country's jury and televoting were released after the grand final; the individual results from each jury member were also released in an anonymised form.

Below is a breakdown of points awarded to the United Kingdom and awarded by United Kingdom in the second semi-final and grand final of the contest, and the breakdown of the jury voting and televoting conducted during the two shows:

Points awarded to the United Kingdom 
In the final, the United Kingdom did not receive any points from the juries or in the televote.

Points awarded by the United Kingdom

Detailed voting results 
The following members comprised the British jury:
 Nicki Chapman – Radio DJ, broadcaster, TV presenter
 Tom Aspaul – singer-songwriter 
 Ross Gautreau – record label owner, producer 
 Michelle Gayle – singer-songwriter, actress
 Aisha Jawando – actress, musician

References

External links
 BBC's official Eurovision website

2021
Countries in the Eurovision Song Contest 2021
Eurovision
Eurovision